Benjamin Gazdic (born August 11, 1987, Toronto) is a Canadian professional ice hockey defender currently playing with KHL Medveščak in the Austrian Hockey League. Gazdic was born to a family of Croatian descent. He holds both Canadian and Croatian passport. His father Mike and brothers Mark and Luke are or were also professional ice hockey players.

Playing career
Gazdic began his career in Canada, where he was active from 2004 to 2010. He played for the St. Michael's Buzzers and Wexford Raiders in the Ontario Junior Hockey League. Gazdic attended McGill University for four years, where he was a member of the university hockey team.

On July 26, 2010, he joined KHL Medveščak of the Erste Bank Eishockey Liga for his first professional season.

Career statistics

References

External links

Ben Gazdic's profile at KHL Medveščak
Ben Gazdic's profile at Croatian hockeyportal

1987 births
Living people
Canadian people of Croatian descent
Croatian people of Canadian descent
KHL Medveščak Zagreb players
McGill University alumni
Ice hockey people from Toronto
Canadian ice hockey defencemen